The United States Agricultural Information Network (USAIN) provides a forum for issues in agricultural information, guides U.S. national information policy for agriculture, and advises the National Agricultural Library.

History 
The original network was based on a recommendation from the 1982 Interagency Panel of the National Agricultural Library (NAL). It was officially launched in 1988. It consisted of a network of public and private agricultural libraries and information centers coordinated by the NAL. Originally, the Executive Council was composed of representatives from land grant and other institutions, and the director of NAL, in an ex-officio capacity. By 1995, the Executive Committee moved from an organization-based network to an individual-based organization, transferring the responsibility for the operations to individuals. At the 1995 USAIN Conference held in Lexington, Kentucky, a slate of grassroots-working agricultural information professionals emerged as the new Executive Council.

Activities

Conferences 
USAIN holds biennial conferences on current themes in agricultural information. This includes collection management and preservation, data management and scholarly communication, curriculum and instruction, outreach and marketing, and national information policy.  
 1990 – University of Illinois at Urbana-Champaign; Inaugural meeting
 1991 – University of Minnesota, Minneapolis, Minnesota; Electronic Information in the Agricultural Sciences
 1993 – Auburn University, Auburn Alabama; Rural Information at the Crossroads: Issues and Opportunities
 1995 – University of Kentucky, Lexington, Kentucky; Cultivating New Ground in Electronic Information: Use of the Information Highway to Support Agriculture.
 1997 – University of Arizona, Tucson, Arizona, joint conference with the International Association of Agricultural Information Specialists(IAALD); The Information Frontier: Linking People and Resources in a Changing World
 1999 – Kansas State University, Manhattan, Kansas, From Production to Consumption: Agricultural Information for All
 2001 – North Carolina State University, Raleigh, North Carolina; Extending Our Reach: Redefining and Promoting Agricultural Information Through Partnerships
 2003 – University of Illinois at Urbana-Champaign, Champaign, Illinois; Agricultural Information for the New Millennium: New Crops, Biotechnology, and Saving the Past
 2005 – University of Kentucky, Lexington, Kentucky, joint conference with the International Association of Agricultural Information Specialists (IAALD) World Congress; The Globalization of Information: Agriculture at the Crossroads  
 2006 – Cornell University, Ithaca, New York; Delivering Information for the New Sciences
 2008 – Ohio State University, Wooster, Ohio; Tradition in Transition: Information Fueling the Future of Agbiosciences
 2010 – Purdue University, West Lafayette, Indiana; Agriculture Without Borders: Creating Knowledge and Partnerships Across Disciplines and Across the World
 2012 – University of Minnesota, Minneapolis, Minnesota; Soil, Water, Food and Energy: Agriculture in an Era of Global Climate Change
 2014 – University of Vermont, Burlington, Vermont; Sustainable Agriculture: Stewardship of our Information Ecosystem
 2016 – University of Florida, Gainesville, Florida; Interdisciplinary Agriculture: Meeting Tomorrow's Global Challenges
 2018 - Washington State University, Pullman, Washington; Consuming Information: Agriculture at the Crossroads of Sustainability
 2020 - Texas Tech University, Lubbock, Texas; Smart Agriculture in the Era of Climate Change

National Preservation Program 
USAIN’s preservation plan for agricultural literature, one of the first discipline-based plans, obtained several rounds of funding from the National Endowment for the Humanities and resulted in 29 state projects,

USAIN recently partnered with Agriculture Network Information Center (AgNIC) and the Center for Research Libraries on Project Ceres, which awards funding for “small projects that preserve print materials essential to the study of the history and economics of agriculture and make those materials accessible through digitization.”

Presidents 
 1988: Nancy Eaton, 1st President, Iowa State University
 1989–90: John Beecher, North Dakota State University
 1990–92: Julia Peterson, Cargill
 1992–93: Richard Rohrer, University of Minnesota
 1993–94: Martha Alexander, University of Missouri
 1994–95: Cynthia Via, Pioneer Hi-Bred International, Inc.
 1995–98: Antoinette Powell, University of Kentucky
 1998–99: Rita Fisher, Washington State University
 1999–00: Barbara Hutchinson, University of Arizona
 2000–01: Diana Farmer, Kansas State University
 2001–02: Amy Paster, Pennsylvania State University
 2002–03: Dana W. R. Boden, University of Nebraska–Lincoln
 2003–04: Jodee Kawasaki, Montana State University
 2004–05: Pat Wilson, University of Kentucky
 2005–06: Lutishoor Salisbury, University of Arkansas
 2006–07: Heather K. Moberly, Oklahoma State University
 2007–08: Norma Kobzina, University of California, Berkeley
 2008–09: Kathleen (Katie) Newman, University of Illinois at Urbana–Champaign
 2009–10: Sheila Merrigan, University of Arizona
 2010–11: Allison Level, Colorado State University
 2011–12: Mary Ochs, Cornell University
 2012–13: Eileen Herring, University of Hawaii at Manoa
 2013–14: Connie Britton, Ohio State University
 2014–15: Valrie I. Minson, University of Florida
 2015–16: Philip Herold, University of Minnesota
 2016–17: Sarah C. Williams, University of Illinois at Urbana–Champaign
 2017–18: Leslie Delserone, University of Nebraska–Lincoln
 2018-19: Kristen Mastel, University of Minnesota
 2019-20: Claudine Jenda, Auburn University

Awards 
Service to the Profession Award for USAIN members who have demonstrated leadership in advancing agricultural information, and established new directions or visions for the field.
Special Achievement Award for members of USAIN who have provided outstanding service or support to USAIN,  outside the sphere of the Executive Committee. It is awarded on an irregular basis. 
Honorary Memberships, given to individuals who are not members of USAIN, but who have been an outstanding individual in the field of agricultural information or have provided outstanding service and support to the Network.
Conference Scholarships, are awarded after a nomination/application process, usually to two New Professionals and one Graduate Student, dependent on the submissions received.

References

External links
 
 AgNIC By-laws and governance, 2006, 2008
 USAIN task force. 2008. Making the Case for a Next-Generation Digital Information System to Ensure America’s Leadership in Agricultural Sciences in the 21st Century

Agricultural organizations based in the United States
Library-related organizations
Professional associations based in the United States
United States National Agricultural Library
Non-profit organizations based in the United States
Scientific organizations established in 1987
1980 establishments in the United States
E-agriculture